Newton, sometimes called Newton in the Willows, is a small village in Northamptonshire. The village, in the Ise valley, is in the civil parish of Newton and Little Oakley which had a population at the 2001 census of 147, decreasing to 126 at the 2011 Census.  It has a combined parish council with Geddington.

The villages name means 'New farm/settlement'.

The Grade II* listed parish church of St Faith in Newton is now deconsecrated. It is largely 14th century, with a 15th-century tower and chancel of 1858 by William Slater. The novelist J. L. Carr fought to prevent the redundancy of the church. The church building was run as Newton Field Centre, an educational centre but closed as unviable in 2018 and has only one trustee. A dovecote, northeast of the church, is a Grade I listed building; it is described as an "outstanding dovecote, exhibiting craftsmanship of the highest quality". It was associated with a mansion of the Tresham family.

In 1607, Newton was the site of the suppression of the Midland Revolt, a peasants' revolt against enclosure; at least 46 rebels were killed. A memorial has been erected by the church where prisoners were held.

References

External links

Villages in Northamptonshire
North Northamptonshire